Lewis Daniel (October 23, 1901 – July 18, 1952) was an American painter. His work was part of the painting event in the art competition at the 1932 Summer Olympics.

References

1901 births
1952 deaths
20th-century Swedish painters
American male painters
Olympic competitors in art competitions
People from New York City